Brown Sahib is a term used to refer to natives of South Asia who imitate Western—typically English—lifestyle. It is also used to refer to those have been heavily influenced by Western—usually British—culture and thinking. It is mostly used as a derogatory term. By implication, a Brown Sahib goes beyond simply mimicking the Western lifestyle. A Brown sahib will usually have an unfair bias towards West vis-à-vis East. Now, down the years sometimes—albeit rarely—it is used just as an affectionate term for an anglicised south Asian, without any colonial critique.

Details
Brown Sahibs invariably dressed in Western clothes, loved Western food, music and the arts and professed a particular affinity for the English language. Though not geographically discrete, they were and are most often found in the three British presidency towns of Calcutta, Bombay and Madras, now the cities of Kolkata, Mumbai and Chennai, respectively. They also usually hailed from a higher social stratum than the mixed race Anglo-Indians. Today they are also often jokingly referred to as 'coconuts' – brown on the outside, white on the inside or more recently Oreos.

Examples of usage
 "Founder and prophet of the Spadecarriers is 60-year-old Inayatullah Khan. A brilliant student at Cambridge, Inayatullah talked Urdu* with an Oxford accent, became known as "the brown sahib (white man)" in India." —Time (1941)
 "Nor does he want to become one what in Asia is called a 'brown sahib', a person who apes the mannerisms of the British." —William Ivor Jennings, The Approach to Self-government (1958)
 The writer Tarzie Vittachi (a political exile from Ceylon) subdivided the category into "Brown Sahibs", "Black Knights" and "Off-White Blimps" in his 1962 book.

References

British India
Pakistani slang
Pakistani English idioms